Minas Hantzidis (born 4 July 1966) is a Greek former footballer. He played for Bayer Leverkusen, VfL Bochum, Olympiacos, Iraklis, Veria, Wuppertaler SV, SV Elversberg, Union Solingen, 1. FC Kleve, TSV 05 Ronsdorf and SpVgg Radevormwald, as well as for the national side. He competed at the 1994 FIFA World Cup.

Personal
Hantzidis has Greek descent, and his family is from Platy, Imathia.

Honours
Bayer Leverkusen
UEFA Cup: 1987-88

International career

International goals
Scores and results list Greece's goal tally first.

References

1966 births
Living people
Greek footballers
German people of Greek descent
Greece international footballers
Super League Greece players
Bundesliga players
Bayer 04 Leverkusen players
Bayer 04 Leverkusen II players
VfL Bochum players
Olympiacos F.C. players
Iraklis Thessaloniki F.C. players
Veria F.C. players
Kastoria F.C. players
Wuppertaler SV players
SV Elversberg players
1. FC Union Solingen players
UEFA Cup winning players
Expatriate footballers in Germany
1994 FIFA World Cup players
Association football midfielders
Footballers from Essen
People from Essen